Arnold van Gennep, in full Charles-Arnold Kurr van Gennep (23 April 1873 – 7 May 1957) was a Dutch–German-French ethnographer and folklorist.

Biography 
He was born in Ludwigsburg, in the Kingdom of Württemberg (since 1871, part of the German Empire). Since his parents were never married, Van Gennep adopted his Dutch mother's name, "van Gennep". When he was six, he and his mother moved to Lyons, France, where she married a French doctor who moved the family to Savoy.

Van Gennep is best known for his work regarding rites of passage ceremonies and his significant works in modern French folklore. He is recognised as the founder of folklore studies in France.

He went to Paris to study at the Sorbonne. However, he was disappointed that the school did not offer the subjects he wanted and so he enrolled at the École des langues orientales to study Arabic and at the École pratique des hautes études for philology, general linguistics, Egyptology, Ancient Arabic, primitive religions and Islamic culture. That scholarly independence would manifest itself for the remainder of his life. He never held an academic position in France.

From 1912 to 1915, he held the Chair of Ethnography at the University of Neuchâtel in Switzerland but was expelled for expressing doubts about the neutrality of Switzerland during World War I. There he reorganized the museum and organized the first ethnographic conference (1914). In 1922, he toured the United States.

His best-known work is Les rites de passage (The Rites of Passage, 1909), which includes his vision of rites of passage rituals as being divided into three phases: préliminaire 'preliminary', liminaire 'liminality' (a stage much studied by the anthropologist Victor Turner), and postliminaire 'post-liminality'.

His major work in French folklore was Le Manuel de folklore français contemporain (Handbook of Contemporary French Folklore, 1937–1958).

He died in 1957 in Bourg-la-Reine, France.

Influences
 The Rites of Passage was highly influential in the structuring of Joseph Campbell's  1949 text, The Hero with a Thousand Faces, as Campbell divides the journey of the hero into three parts, Departure, Initiation, and Return.
 The Rites of Passage influenced anthropologist Victor Turner's research, particularly his 1969 text, The Ritual Process: Structure and Anti-Structure.

Works
 Le Tissage aux Cartons et son utilisation décorative dans l'Egypte Ancienne, Neuchatel, Switzerland: Delachaux & Niestlé, 1916, co-author Gustave Jeqier. English translation Cardweaving in Ancient Egypt Barbara Shapiro, transl. San Francisco, 2010.
 Traité comparatif des nationalités, Paris: Payot, 1922
 Tabou et Totemisme a Madagascar Etude Descriptive et Theorique, Paris: 1904
 Essai d’une théorie des langues spécialesl, Paris: 1908
 Works at archive.org
 The Rites of Passage, 1909. University of Chicago Press, 1960. web page
 Les Jeux et les Sports populaires de France: Arnold Van Gennep (textes inédits 1925), L.S. Fournier (éd.), Paris, éditions du Comité des travaux historiques et scientifiques, 2015.

References
 Arnold van Gennep at unjobs.org
 Belmont, Nicole Arnold van Gennep: The Creator of French Ethnography Derek Coltman trans.  Chicago: University of Chicago Press, 1979
 Daniel Fabre et Christine Laurière (dir.), Arnold Van Gennep: du folklore à l'ethnographie, Paris, éditions du Comité des travaux historiques et scientifiques, 2018.
 Rosemary Lévy Zumwalt, The Enigma of Arnold Van Gennep (1873–1957): Master of French Folklore and Hermit of Bourg-la-Reine. Thesis – University of California Berkeley, 1978.

External links
 
 
 Arnold van Gennep on data.bnf.fr

1873 births
1957 deaths
People from Ludwigsburg
French ethnographers
French folklorists
Anthropologists of religion
People from the Kingdom of Württemberg
People from Savoie
Academic staff of the University of Neuchâtel
French male writers
French people of Dutch descent
Emigrants from the German Empire to France